Youyou Kisita Milandu, known as Youyou Kisita, is a DR Congolese footballer. She has been a member of the DR Congo women's national team.

Club career
Kisita has played for Progresso in Angola.

International career
Kisita capped for the DR Congo at senior level during the 2006 African Women's Championship.

International goals
Scores and results list DR Congo's goal tally first

See also
 List of Democratic Republic of the Congo women's international footballers

References

Living people
Democratic Republic of the Congo women's footballers
Democratic Republic of the Congo women's international footballers
Democratic Republic of the Congo expatriate footballers
Democratic Republic of the Congo expatriate sportspeople in Angola
Expatriate women's footballers in Angola
Year of birth missing (living people)
Women's association footballers not categorized by position